Richard August François Declerck (31 December 1899 – 12 March 1986) was a Belgian lawyer and politician. He was governor of the province of Antwerp from 7 January 1946 until 31 December 1966.

Political career
Richard Declerck was a member of the communal council of Bruges from 1933 until 1938.

Sources
 Steve Heylen, Bart De Nil, Bart D’hondt, Sophie Gyselinck, Hanne Van Herck en Donald Weber, Geschiedenis van de provincie Antwerpen. Een politieke biografie, Antwerpen, Provinciebestuur Antwerpen, 2005, Vol. 2 p. 48

1899 births
1986 deaths
Governors of Antwerp Province
People from Antwerp Province